Fleetwood Park Secondary is a public high school in Surrey, British Columbia part of School District 36 Surrey. The school ranked 48 of 293 according to the Fraser Institute Studies in Education Policy in 2012–2013 with a 97.2% graduation rate.

Sports
In 2014 and 2016 the Senior Girls Soccer team won the AAA Soccer Provincials.

References

External links
Fleetwood Park Secondary School Official Website

High schools in Surrey, British Columbia
Educational institutions in Canada with year of establishment missing